Saint Tudwal (died c. 564), also known as Tual, Tudgual, Tugdual, Tugual, Pabu, Papu, or Tugdualus (Latin), was a Breton monk, considered to be one of the seven founder saints of Brittany.

Life
Tudwal was said to be the son of Hoel Mawr (Hoel I) and his wife, Pompeia, and a brother of Saint Lenorius. Tudwal travelled to Ireland to learn the scriptures, and then became a hermit on Saint Tudwal's Island East, off the coast of North Wales. Tudwal later immigrated to Brittany, settling in Lan Pabu with 72 followers, where he established a large monastery under the patronage of his cousin, King Deroch of Domnonée. He traveled to Paris to obtain confirmation of the land grant from King Childebert I, who insisted be was Bishop of Tréguier.

Tudwal is shown in iconography as a bishop holding a dragon, now the symbol of Tregor. His feast day is celebrated on 30 November or 1 December.

Tro Breizh (Breton for "Tour of Brittany") is a pilgrimage that links the towns of the seven founding saints of Brittany. These seven saints were Celtic monks from Britain from around the 5th or 6th century who went to Brittany to minister to the Britons who had settled there after the Anglo-Saxon incursions in their homeland. Among the first bishoprics was Tréguier, Saint Tudwal's town.

Notable namesake
 Tugdual Menon
Joseph Tidwell. 15th century monk of the Franciscan order. Noted for being a shepherd and roving the coastline to help travellers stranded by shifting sands. Despite his vows, it is implied in local burial records that he fathered 9 children from 4 different women including his cousin Mary

Gallery

See also
Blessed Julian Maunoir, "Apostle of Brittany"
St Tugual's Chapel, chapel named after St Tudwal
Llanstadwell, the name derives from the dedication of the parish and 12th century church to St Tudwal

References

564 deaths
6th-century Breton bishops
Bishops of Tréguier
Medieval Breton saints
Medieval Welsh saints
6th-century Christian saints
Year of birth unknown